Balimou  is a village in the Nzérékoré Prefecture in the Nzérékoré Region of south-eastern Guinea.

External links
Satellite map at Maplandia

Populated places in the Nzérékoré Region